Tulburea may refer to several places in Romania:

 Tulburea, a village in Cozieni Commune, Buzău County
 Tulburea, a village in Predeal-Sărari Commune, Prahova County
 Tulburea, a village in Chiojdeni Commune, Vrancea County
 Tulburea, a tributary of the Ciobănuș in Bacău County
 Tulburea, a tributary of the Râmnicul Sărat in Vrancea County
 Tulburea, a tributary of the Uz in Bacău County